John Benitez (born November 7, 1957), also known as Jellybean, is an American musician, songwriter, DJ, remixer, and music producer. He has produced and remixed artists such as Madonna, Whitney Houston, Michael Jackson, and the Pointer Sisters. He was later the executive producer of Studio 54 Radio. In December 2016, Billboard magazine ranked him as the 99th most successful dance artist of all-time.

Life and career

Early life
Benitez was born in the South Bronx neighborhood of New York City, the son of Puerto Rican parents. After his parents divorced, Benitez and his younger sister Debbie were raised by their mother, who worked in the executive offices of Sloan's supermarkets. Benitez grew up enjoying music and would watch deejays at local clubs. Benitez borrowed his sister's record player and practiced on two turntables. His sister, nicknamed him Jellybean as his initials are J.B. and from the expression "Know what I mean, Jellybean?," he said. Benitez attended De Witt Clinton High School and John F. Kennedy High School, but did not graduate. He would skip school and play at hooky parties. When a neighbor paid him to play at a Sweet 16 party, he realized he could have a career as a deejay.

Music career
In 1976, Benitez got a weekend job deejaying between salsa bands at a club called Charlie's in the Bronx. He convinced the owner to open a non-alcoholic dance club, and he used the live audience to experiment on. By this time, he was kicked out of school for truancy. Benitez wanted to move to Manhattan, so he worked at a club called La Mariposa in Washington Heights. Then he switched to the Experimental Four club in Midtown Manhattan.

In 1978, Benitez was making $100 for a four-night week when he moved to an apartment on the West Side of Manhattan. After earning a high school equivalency diploma, Benitez enrolled at Bronx Community College as a psychology major and took voice and diction classes. In 1979, Benitez worked back and forth between Manhattan and Long Island. He worked seven nights a week at Hurrah, and Le Mouches in New York City, Club Marrakesh in Westhampton, Blue Cloud in Southampton, and La Falafel. Between 1976 and 1980, Benitez also played at New York New York, Studio 54, Le Jardin, and the Grand Ballroom. He eventually settled at the Electric Circus and Xenon in New York City. In 1981, he was hired as the resident DJ at Funhouse. He hosted a weekend dance radio show at WKTU. Soon, Benitez was influencing the dance charts. He pushed the records "Planet Rock" (1982) and "Let the Music Play" (1983). Record companies would send him awards when the records went gold.

In 1983, an executive from Warner Bros. Records introduced Benitez to Madonna at the Funhouse. At the time she had released one single, "Everybody" (1982), which he played at the club. They became friends and Madonna asked Benitez to remix her 1983 debut album Madonna; soon after a romance ensued. Benitez remixed her singles "Burning Up", "Borderline", and "Lucky Star." He also produced "Holiday," which was her first international top ten hit song. "While I was launching her career, I was launching my career as a producer," he said. Benitez continued to deejay at the Funhouse while producing and remixing for other artists. In 1984, Benitez remixed Madonna's hit song "Like a Virgin" and landed a producing deal with EMI America Records. In May 1985, Steve Rubell and Ian Schrager opened the Palladium in New York City. They asked Benitez to play at the grand opening and be a resident deejay at the club. After Benitez's production of Madonna's song "Crazy for You" went No. 1 the same week, Rubell decided that Benitez has become "more of a commercial-record producer than a cutting-edge spinner" and decided to replace him.

Benitez remixed songs for various artists, including for Paul McCartney, Michael Jackson, Billy Joel, David Bowie, Sting, Talking Heads, Deniece Williams, Elvis Costello, Fleetwood Mac, the Pointer Sisters, and ZZ Top. 

In 1985, Benitez signed a production deal with Warner Bros. Records. When Warner Bros. asked Benitez to produce a non-rap song for the Krush Groove soundtrack, he suggested Debbie Harry, who was resurrecting her career. They composed the song "Feel the Spin" (1985) together. Benitez produced Whitney Houston's Top ten hit "Love Will Save the Day" from her 1987 sophomore album Whitney. Benitez was the musical producer for the film The Principal (1987) and produced the theme for Mel Brooke's film Spaceballs (1987). 

Benitez had success with his own records as well. Between 1984 and 1991, he had nine recordings placed in the top ten of the U.S. Hot Dance Music/Club Play chart, including three number ones. Benitez released his debut album Wotupski!?! on EMI America in 1984. His 1984 cover of Babe Ruth's "The Mexican," for which he recruited original singer Janita Haan, regarded as a pivotal moment in the electro-hip hop underground scene, and was his first number-one single on the Hot Dance Music/Club Play chart. His single "Sidewalk Talk" (US No. 18, UK No. 47) was written by Madonna and became a top 20 hit, which made him the first DJ to appear on the pop chart as an artist. Four singles from his 1984 album Just Visiting This Planet reached the top 20 in the UK. The 1987 track "Who Found Who" (US No. 16) features Elisa Fiorillo. In 1991, the album Spillin' the Beans saw Benitez work with John Oates, Roy Ayers and Roy Hay. The single "What's It Going To Be" featured Niki Haris, one of three main vocalists on the album together with Cindy Valentine and Deanna Eve. The album received mixed reviews with Ian Cranna in Q Magazine calling it "functional but forgettable". Other vocalists who have performed on a Jellybean release include Adele Bertei and Richard Darbyshire. 

In 1995, Benitez launched an independent Latin label, H.O.L.A. Recordings (Home Of Latin Artists), which was backed by Wasserstein Perella and PolyGram Records. After not playing anywhere for a decade, David Mancuso invited Benitez to deejay at The Loft in New York City in 2001. Benitez continues to deejay globally. He owns Jellybean Productions, Jellybean Soul and Jellybean Music Group. In 1995, he founded the now-defunct H.O.L.A. recording label (House of Latin Artists) which developed hip hop and R&B music by bilingual artists and released recordings in both English and Spanish. Voices of Theory signed with this label. In 2005, Benitez was inducted into the Dance Music Hall of Fame.

SiriusXM
Benitez is currently the executive producer of Studio 54 Radio, which is heard exclusively on SiriusXM Satellite Radio (Channel 54). Studio 54 Radio launched in 2011. It features 1970s and 1980s classic dance from Jellybean's personal collection and the vaults and collections of Studio 54 insiders.

Personal life
Benitez dated Madonna and model Nikki Scorsese in the 1980s. He married former Wilhelmina model and restaurateur Carolyn Effer in 1991. They have two daughters, Layla Benitez and Reya Benitez. They lived in the Gramercy Park neighborhood of Manhattan.

Partial discography

Albums

Singles

Production

Selected remixes

Motion Picture / Television
Benitez composed the theme song to Ricki Lake (1993 talk show) and The Charles Perez Show. He produced motion pictures and was nominated for a Golden Globe Award and an Emmy for his role as an Executive Producer for HBO's For Love or Country: The Arturo Sandoval Story starring Andy Garcia.  He served as music supervisor and created and mixed tunes for many soundtracks.

Music Supervisor
Among the motion pictures for which he served as Music Supervisor are:

Soundtrack works
Among the motion picture soundtracks for which he created and mixed tunes are:

Television works
Among the television show soundtracks for which he created and mixed tunes are:

See also

 List of club DJs
 List of Puerto Ricans
 List of number-one dance hits (United States)
 List of artists who reached number one on the US Dance chart
 List of house music artists

References

Sources

Aletti, Vince (1998). "The Disco Files 1973–1978". Djhistory.com. 
Bego, Mark (1984). "Michae!". Pinnacle Books. 
Black, Johnny (2006). "Singles: Six Decades of Hot Hits and Classic Cuts" Thunder Bay Press. 
Bennet, James (2005). "100 Best-Selling Albums". Barnes & Noble.  
Brewster, Bill & Broughton, Frank (1999). "Last Night a DJ Saved My Life"  Headline Publishing Group. 
Bronson, Fred (2003). "The Billboard Book of Number 1 Hits". Billboard Books. .
Cheren, Mel (2000). "My Life and the Paradise Garage/Keep on Dancin'". 24 Hours for Life. 
Doyle, William & Failde, Augusto (1997). "Latino Success". Simon & Schuster 
Du Noyer, Paul (2003). "The Billboard Illustrated Encyclopedia of Music: From Rock, Pop, Jazz, Blues, and Hip Hop to Classical, Country, Folk, World and More". Watson Guptill 
Gambaccini, Paul   &   Rice, Tim   &   Rice, Jonathan (1990). "British Hit Albums 4th Edition". Guinness World Records Limited. 
Gambaccini, Paul   &   Rice, Tim   &   Rice, Jonathan (1990). " Hits of the 80s". Guinness Publishing Ltd.  
Gap, The (2006). "Individuals: Portraits from the Gap Collection". Melcher Media. 
Gruen, John (1992). "Keith Haring: The Authorized Biography". Fireside Books. 
Haden-Guest, Anthony (1997) The Last Party: Studio 54, Disco, and the Culture of the Night. New York: William Morrow and Company, 
King, Norman (1992). "Madonna: The Book". William Morrow and Company 
Lawrence, Tim (2016) Life and Death on the New York Dance Floor 1980-1983.Duke University Press 
Lawrence, Tim (2004) Love Saves the Day: A History of Dance Music Culture 1970–1979. 
Mahler, Jonathan (2007). "The Bronx is Burning: 1977, Baseball, Politics, and the Battle for Soul of the City". Picador. 
McMullan, Patrick (2003). "So80s: A Photographic Diary of a Decade. Powerhouse Cultural Entertainment Incorporated. 
Reighley, Kurt (2000). "Looking for the Perfect Beat: The Art and Culture of the Dj". Pocket Books.  
Roberts, David (2006). British Hit Singles & Albums (19th ed.). London: Guinness World Records Limited. p. 140. 
Rodgers, Nile (2011). "Le Freak: An Upside Down Story of Family, Disco, and Destiny". Random House Publishing. 
Rolling Stones Magazine (1997). "Madonna, The Rolling Stones Files". Hyperion Books.  
Shapiro, Peter (2007). "Turn the Beat Around: The History of Disco". Faber & Faber. 
Sussman, Elisabeth (1997). "Keith Haring". Little, Brown and Company. 
Taraborrelli, J. Randy (2007). "Madonna: An Intimate Biography". Simon & Schuster. 
Warhol, Andy and Pat Hackett (1989) "The Andy Warhol Diaries" New York: Warner Books. 
Wilson, Mary  &  Romanowski, Patricia (1990). "SUPREME FAITH Someday We'll Be Together". HarperCollins. 
Whitburn, Joel (1995). "Billboard Hot 100 Charts – The Eighties (Record Research Series)". Record Research. 
Whitburn, Joel (2004). "Hot Dance Disco 1974–2003". Billboard Books. 
Whitburn, Joel (2011). "Hot R&B Songs 1942–2010: 6th Edition". Record Research. 
Whitburn, Joel (2011). "Joel Whitburn Presents Billboard's Top Pop Singles 1955–2010". Record Research. 
Whitburn, Joel (2010). "The Billboard Book of Top 40Hits, 9th Edition: Complete Chart Information about America's Most Popular Songs and Artists, 1955–2009". Billboard Books. 
Whitburn, Joel (2011). "Top Pop Singles 1955–2010". Record Research. 
Warhol, Andy & Hackett, Pat (1988). "Andy Warhol's Party Book". Crown Publishing Group.

External links

John "Jellybean" Benitez on AllMusic

1957 births
Living people
Musicians from New York City
DJs from New York City
American dance musicians
American house musicians
American boogie musicians
American freestyle musicians
American musicians of Puerto Rican descent
Club DJs
Chrysalis Records artists
EMI Records artists
Remixers
20th-century American musicians
20th-century American male musicians
21st-century American musicians
21st-century American male musicians
Atlantic Records artists
People from Gramercy Park
People from the Bronx
Electronic dance music DJs